Philomene Magers (born 1965) is a German art dealer and co-owner of Sprüth Magers in Berlin, London, and Los Angeles, along with Monika Sprüth.

Career
The daughter of an art dealer in Bonn, Magers studied art history at Ludwig Maximilian University of Munich. She opened her first gallery in Cologne in 1991.

In 2014, The Guardian named Magers in their "Movers and makers: the most powerful people in the art world".

Personal life
Magers is married to film director and producer Jan Schmidt-Garre. They have two children, and live in Berlin.

References

Living people
German art dealers
Women art dealers
Ludwig Maximilian University of Munich alumni
Businesspeople from Bonn
Recipients of the Order of Merit of Berlin
1965 births